The 1908 The Citadel Bulldogs football team represented The Citadel as an independent during the 1908 college football season. This was the fourth year of intercollegiate football at The Citadel, with Ralph Foster serving as coach for the third season. The Board of Visitors would not permit the cadets to travel outside the city of Charleston for games, and all games are believed to have been played at Hampton Park at the site of the old race course.

Schedule

References

Citadel
The Citadel Bulldogs football seasons
Citadel Bulldogs football